RecordTV Europa is a Portuguese pay television channel owned by RecordTV, a Brazilian television network. Its programming is mostly taken from the Brazilian network. It provides general entertainment, telenovelas, Brazilian reality TV shows, and news. Similar to what happened in Brazil, TV Record's main competitor is Globo. Igreja Universal do Reino de Deus religious programming is transmitted at late nights.

References 

Television stations in Portugal
Television channels and stations established in 2005
RecordTV affiliates